Greppen is a municipality in the district of Lucerne in the canton of Lucerne in Switzerland.

It lies at the base of huge Mount Rigi. The exclave is separated by Lake Lucerne from the rest of the district.

History
Greppen shares the history of its neighboring community of Weggis. Mentioned for the first time, albeit indirectly, in 1259 as Crepon, in a document of Heinrich von Heidegg, it belonged to the Habsburgs, and was sold to Lucerne in 1406 as part of the Vogti Neuhabsburg. In 1803 it was assigned to the District of Lucerne.

Geography

Greppen lies on the eastern shore of the Küssnacht arm of Lake Lucerne, at the base of Mount Rigi. Greppen stretches from Lake Lucerne up the west slope of Mount Rigi to just below Rigi-Staffel (elev. ). The Breitenacherreid is a nature preserve.

Of this area, 50.9% is used for agricultural purposes, while 39.7% is forested. The rest of the land, (9.4%) is settled. , 39.7% of the total land area was forested. Of the agricultural land, 43.94% is used for farming or pastures, while 6.97% is used for orchards or vine crops. Of the settled areas, 7.88% is covered with buildings, 0.3% is industrial, and 1.21% is transportation infrastructure.

Neighboring Municipalities
Greppen borders on Weggis and Küssnacht in Canton Schwyz. It also shares a water border with Meggen.

Population

Population Growth
In 1798 there were only 240 inhabitants. The population grew until 1860 (1798-1860: +23.8%) and then fell to only by 244 by 1900. In the next twenty years, tourism brought with it rapid population growth (1900-1920: +51.8%). The number of inhabitants then remained about the same until 1980. Since then, the population has grown (1980-2004: +143.8%) because of improved transportation, the municipality's mild climate, and its proximity to Lucerne and Küssnacht. Over the last 10 years the population has grown at a rate of 28.2%.

The historical population is given in the following table:

Languages
As of 2000, 94.03% of the population speaks German, 1.3% speak English, and 0.91% speak French.

Religions-Denominations
The population is traditionally Catholic. , 65.97% were Roman Catholic, 19.87% were Protestant, 1.04% were Orthodox Christians, and 0.52% were Old Catholic. Nonchristian minorities included Atheists (8.44%), Muslims (1.3%) and (2.47%) who did not answer the question.

Origin and Nationality
In 2000, 90.39% of the population were Swiss citizens, of whom only 85.84% had passports. Immigrant groups included Germans (4.03%, or 4.68%, including those with dual citizenship), and Italians (0.65%, or 1.95%). Smaller immigrant groups were from France, Austria, Slovakia, Serbia and Montenegro and Macedonia. , 10.9% of the population was made up of foreign nationals.

Age profile
The age distribution in Greppen is; 246 people or 26.1% of the population is 0–19 years old. 237 people or 25.2% are 20–39 years old, and 367 people or 39% are 40–64 years old. The senior population distribution is 74 people or 7.9% are 65–79 years old, 14 or 1.5% are 80–89 years old and 3 people or 0.3% of the population are 90+ years old.

Households
 there are 293 households, of which 82 households (or about 28.0%) contain only a single individual. 30 or about 10.2% are large households, with at least five members.  there were 184 inhabited buildings in the municipality, of which 144 were built only as housing, and 40 were mixed use buildings. There were 97 single family homes, 27 double family homes, and 20 multi-family homes in the municipality. Most homes were either two (70) or three (52) story structures. There were only 5 single story buildings and 17 four or more story buildings.

Municipal Council
The non-professional Municipal Council is formed of the following:
Marc Schnyder (Municipal President; Culture, Leisure, Economy)
Kurt Greter (Mayor; Real estate, Safety, Education, Traffic and Finance)
Roswitha Jenni (Social welfare)

Elections
In the canton-level elections of 2003, the civil parties won the following portions of the votes: CVP 33.16%, FDP 27.59%, SVP 19.07%. The leftist and progressive parties (SP and Green Alliance) won large portions of the votes, 9.48% and 8.25%, respectively, considering that Greppen is a rural municipality in the Lucerne District. Among the smallest parties, the Aktiven Senioren (Active Seniors) did the best, with 1.27%.

In the 2007 election the most popular party was the SVP which received 29.4% of the vote. The next three most popular parties were the CVP (26.5%), the FDP (23%) and the SPS (10.1%).

"Fusion" Project
The three municipalities near Mount Rigi in the District of Lucerne are planning a gradual union, because they already work together on many issues.

Economy
The population of Greppen find their livelihood in many diverse fields. Although traditionally dominated by cattle and alpine dairy farming, and fishing, people also raised Chestnuts (in the mild climate) and mined Tuff. The widely used silk and linen weaving factories of the 19th century have disappeared. Major employers include culinary operations, (moderate) tourism, pharmaceuticals, and construction. The commuter balance paints a clear picture. 40 people commute to Greppen, whereas 280 (among a total of 421 employed) commute from Greppen (26.8% to Canton Schwyz, 20.7% to Canton Zug, 12.9% to Lucerne, and 11.4% to the neighboring municipality of Weggis).

Greppen has an unemployment rate of 1.36%. , there were 47 people employed in the primary economic sector and about 17 businesses involved in this sector. 35 people are employed in the secondary sector and there are 13 businesses in this sector. 69 people are employed in the tertiary sector, with 31 businesses in this sector.  54.7% of the population of the municipality were employed in some capacity. At the same time, females made up 41.3% of the workforce.

Tourism
Because of such diverse projects as the alignment of the Zürichsee-Gotthard railroad track along Mount Rigi, and the failure to construct a railroad up Mount Rigi departing from Greppen, tourism is not as important in Greppen as it is in nearby municipalities. Two restaurants of renown in Greppen are the Eidgenossen and St. Wendelin/Fische.

Transportation
Greppen has possessed a ship dock of the Schifffahrtsgesellschaft des Vierwaldstättersees (SGV or Ship company of Lake Lucerne) since 1869. This company also set up a bus line from Küssnacht to Brunnen via Weggis in 1932, which is important to local public transportation. The nearest train station is in Küssnacht, on the track from Lucerne to Goldau. There is also a train station in Brunnen, which is on the Gotthard line.

Schools
There has been a village primary school in Greppen since 1809, which is attended by students in Kindergarten through grade 6. There are 8 students in Kindergarten and 84 students in the elementary grades. Students in grades 7 and above attend school in neighboring Weggis. The principal is Ruth Steiert-Hurschler.

The entire Swiss population is generally well educated. In Greppen about 81.9% of the population (between age 25-64) have completed either non-mandatory upper secondary education or additional higher education (either university or a Fachhochschule).

Attractions
In the 14th century the holy order of St. Wendelin was established, and a village chapel of St. Wendelin was built between 1483-85. This church had to yield to the parish church of St. Wendelin in about 1645. There is an annual pilgrimage to Greppen on October 20. The relatively intact village quality of Greppen has put it on the Inventar schützenswerter Ortschaften, or the "Inventory of protected communities."

References

J. Muheim-Büeler, J. Studhalter: Greppen. 1997.

External links
 Official Website of the municipality of Greppen (in German)

 "Fusion" Project Website (in German)

Municipalities of the canton of Lucerne
Populated places on Lake Lucerne